Charles Ormerod Cato "Ormy" Pearse (10 October 1884 – 28 May 1953) was a South African cricketer who played in three Tests from 1910 to 1911. His brother was the first-class cricketer Vyvyan Pearse.

Pearse was born into a military family in Pietermaritzburg and attended Maritzburg College there. After leaving school he took up banking. He married Dorothy Vera Shepstone in Pietermaritzburg in January 1918. He died of coronary thrombosis at home in Durban on 28 May 1953, aged 68.

References

External links
 

1884 births
1953 deaths
Cricketers from Pietermaritzburg
South Africa Test cricketers
South African cricketers
KwaZulu-Natal cricketers
Alumni of Maritzburg College